Roberto Antonelli (born 15 April 1968) is a former Italian male long-distance runner who competed at one edition of the IAAF World Cross Country Championships at senior level (2000).

References

External links
 Roberto Antonelli profile at Association of Road Racing Statisticians

1968 births
Living people
Italian male long-distance runners
Italian male cross country runners